Kawabaru Dam  is a gravity dam located in Miyazaki Prefecture in Japan. The dam is used for power production. The catchment area of the dam is 359.2 km2. The dam impounds about 42  ha of land when full and can store 3220 thousand cubic meters of water. The construction of the dam was started on 1937 and completed in 1939.

See also
List of dams in Japan

References

Dams in Miyazaki Prefecture